The Partner (1997) is a legal/thriller novel by American author John Grisham. It was Grisham's eighth novel.

Plot
It's been four years since Patrick Lanigan, a junior partner in a law firm in Biloxi, Mississippi, learned of the scheme, masterminded by his firm's client, shipbuilding magnate Benny Aricia, to defraud the U.S. government. The firm's senior partners didn't include Lanigan in the plan, in which they stood to make tens of millions of dollars. Lanigan then devised a plan of his own, wherein he faked his death, stole $90 million from the secret off-shore accounts where the firm had been hiding the ill-gotten gains, and then fled to South America. Since then, Lanigan started a new life with new-found love Eva. But Aricia had men track him down, ruthless men who will do whatever it takes, including torture, to reclaim the stolen fortune. In a desperate bid, Lanigan gives complete control of the money to Eva, then turns himself over to the FBI. Once returned to the U.S., Lanigan must fight multiple legal battles, in state, civil and federal courts, involving a former client, his estranged wife, and the highest levels of government, to protect the people he cares for, gain his freedom and, finally get back to Eva and the part of the fortune they secretly set aside.

Critical reception
Publishers Weekly wrote: "To call the plot of The Partner mechanical is at least partly a compliment: it is well-oiled, intricate and works smoothly. But its cynicism is remorseless." Kirkus Reviews called the book Grisham's "best-plotted novel yet," praising the "masterfully bittersweet end."

References 

1997 American novels
Novels by John Grisham
Novels set in Mississippi
Novels set in Brazil
Biloxi, Mississippi
Mato Grosso do Sul